Washington Park Historic District may refer to:
 Washington Park Historic District (Ottawa, Illinois)
 Washington Park Historic District (Indianapolis, Indiana)
 Washington Park Historic District (Newton, Massachusetts)
 Washington Park Historic District (North Plainfield, New Jersey), a National Register of Historic Places listing in Somerset County, New Jersey
 Washington Park Historic District (Albany, New York)
 Washington Park Historic District (Troy, New York)
 Washington Park Historic District (Winston-Salem, North Carolina), a National Register of Historic Places listing in Forsyth County, North Carolina

See also
Washington Park (disambiguation)
Washington Park Reservoirs Historic District, Portland, OR, a National Register of Historic Places listing in Southwest Portland, Oregon